Kibbi may refer to:

Kibbeh, a dish made of bulgah and chopped meat
Kibi, Ghana, a town in southeastern Ghana

See also
Kibi (disambiguation)